Below is a list of events in chess during the year 2009, as well as the men's and women's FIDE rankings of that year:

Events
 January 1 – Veselin Topalov (Bulgaria) gains 5 rating points to remain at the head the FIDE top 100 players list at 2796. Viswanathan Anand (India) is second at 2791.

 December 8–15 – The inaugural London Chess Classic is played in London. Magnus Carlsen (Norway) wins ahead of Vladimir Kramnik (Russia) and David Howell (England).

Titles awarded

Grandmaster
In 2009 FIDE awarded the title Grandmaster to the following players:

Woman Grandmaster

Deaths
 22 January : Héctor Rossetto
 27 April : Miroslav Filip

References

 
21st century in chess
Chess by year